Chiemi (written: , , ,  or  in katakana) is a feminine Japanese given name. Notable people with the name include:

, Japanese comedian
, Japanese voice actress, singer and model
, Japanese singer and actress
, Japanese singer, actress, and entertainer
, Japanese guitarist and vocalist, formerly of the Japanese rock band Mass of the Fermenting Dregs
, Japanese long-distance runner
, Japanese voice actress and singer

Japanese feminine given names